Garfield: A Tail of Two Kitties (released in some countries as Garfield 2) is a 2006 American comedy film directed by Tim Hill and written by Joel Cohen and Alec Sokolow. It is the sequel to the 2004 film Garfield: The Movie. The film stars Breckin Meyer and Jennifer Love Hewitt reprising their roles as Jon Arbuckle and Dr. Liz Wilson respectively, and Bill Murray reprising his role as the voice of Garfield. New cast members include Billy Connolly, Ian Abercrombie, Roger Rees, Lucy Davis and Oliver Muirhead in live-action roles and Tim Curry, Bob Hoskins, Rhys Ifans, Vinnie Jones, Joe Pasquale, Richard E. Grant, and Jane Leeves as the voices of the film's new animal characters. In the film, Garfield, Odie, Liz and Jon travel to the United Kingdom, where Prince, another cat that looks exactly like Garfield, is ruling over a castle after the death of his owner. His reign is soon jeopardized by an evil aristocrat, who plans to remodel the castle into condominiums, destroy the estate, and get rid of Prince.

Produced by Davis Entertainment for 20th Century Fox, it was released in the United States on June 16, 2006. Although it became a commercial success, grossing $143 million against its $60 million budget, like its predecessor, the film also received generally negative reviews from critics. A video game of the same name was developed by The Game Factory.

Plot
Two years after the events of the first film, Jon Arbuckle plans to propose to his girlfriend, veterinarian Dr. Elizabeth "Liz" Wilson, who is going on a business trip to London. Jon follows Liz to the United Kingdom as a surprise; after escaping from a kennel, Jon's two pets, Garfield and Odie, sneak into Jon's luggage and join him on the trip. Garfield and Odie break out of the hotel room due to boredom, and subsequently get lost in the streets of London.

Meanwhile, at Carlyle Castle in the English countryside, the late Lady Eleanor Carlyle's will is read by the solicitors, Mr. Hobbs, Mr. Greene and Mrs. Whitney. She bequeaths Carlyle Castle to Prince XII, her beloved cat who lives a strong life of luxury, and bears a strong resemblance to Garfield. This enrages the Lady's greedy nephew, Lord Manfred Dargis, who will now only receive a stipend of £50 a week and inherit the grand estate once Prince passes away. Lord Dargis traps Prince in a picnic basket and throws him into the river. Jon finds Prince climbing out of a drain and takes him to the hotel after mistaking him for Garfield, while Prince's butler, Smithee, finds Garfield in the street and takes him to Carlyle Castle after mistaking him for Prince.

In the grand estate, Garfield receives a great deal of special treatment, including a butler and a group of four-legged followers, lead by Prince's loyal bulldog servant, Winston. Winston convinces the animals to tolerate and protect Garfield in order to prevent Lord Dargis from getting his hands on the estate, which he plans to turn into a SPA resort by demolishing the area and slaughtering the animals. With Garfield's presence, Dargis thinks Prince has returned and fears that the solicitors will not sign the estate over for him. He makes many attempts to kill Garfield, but fails every time due to the animals interfering. Garfield befriends the animals and teaches them how to make lasagna while Prince learns how to be an ordinary pet. Despite both of them enjoying their new lifestyles, they soon begin to missing their old lives, Garfield especially after overhearing the animals complaining about his slobby and selfish attitude for a royal cat.

Eventually, Garfield and Prince meet each other for the first time after both attempting to return to their old lives. Garfield, having understand of what is at stake for Prince and his subjects, convinces them to help him defeat Dargis. Jon and Odie discover the mix-up and go to the castle, which Liz is coincidentally visiting. 
Garfield and Prince taunt Dargis, whose plan is exposed, and the two cats are seen by the solicitors. Dargis barges in, holding a blunderbuss and threatening the solicitors if they do not sign the papers giving him ownership of the estate while also taking Liz hostage. Jon attempts to force Dargis to release Liz by holding a crossbow at him, only for Dargis to threaten to kill Jon for getting involved in the first place. Garfield and Prince, with the help of Odie and Jon, save the day while Smithee alerts the authorities and Dargis is arrested for his crimes. Garfield, who had been trying to stop Jon from proposing to Liz, has a change of heart: he helps Jon propose to Liz, and she accepts.

Cast

Live action
 Breckin Meyer as Jon Arbuckle, the owner of Garfield and Odie.
 Jennifer Love Hewitt as Dr. Liz Wilson, Jon's veterinarian girlfriend/fiancée.
 Billy Connolly as Lord Manfred Dargis, an evil lord who wants to remodel Carlyle Castle into condominiums.
 Ian Abercrombie as Smithee, the Carlyle Castle butler.
 Roger Rees as Mr. Hobbs, a solicitor.
 Lucy Davis as Abby Westminister, a solicitor.
 Jane Carr as Mrs. Whitney, a solicitor.
 Oliver Muirhead as Mr. Greene, a solicitor.
 Ben Falcone as an American tourist.
 JB Blanc as porter.

Voice cast
 Bill Murray as Garfield, an orange tabby cat who loves lasagna.
 Tim Curry as Prince XII, an English cat who is a twin counterpart of Garfield.
 Bob Hoskins as Winston, an English bulldog who is Prince's servant.
 Rhys Ifans as McBunny, a Scottish-accented Belgian hare.
 Vinnie Jones as Rommel, a rottweiler who is Lord Dargis's former companion.
 Jim Piddock as Bolero, a Spanish Fighting Bull.
 Joe Pasquale as Claudius, a rat.
 Greg Ellis as Nigel, a ferret.
 Richard E. Grant as Preston, a Scarlet Macaw.
 Sharon Osbourne as Christophe, a goose.
 Jane Leeves as Eenie, a duck.
 Jane Horrocks as Meenie, a duck.
 Roscoe Lee Browne as the Narrator.

Release

Box office
Garfield: A Tail of Two Kitties grossed $28.4 million in North America, and $113.3 million in other countries, for a worldwide total of $141.7 million. The film opened to number seven in its first weekend, grossing $7.3 million. According to 20th Century Fox, the studio was aware that the film would not make as much as the first, and only made it based on the worldwide success of the first film.

Home media
The film was released on DVD on October 10, 2006. The DVD includes a "Drawing with Jim Davis" featurette, teaching viewers how to draw Garfield, Odie and Garfield’s teddy bear Pooky, and two games: Garfield's Maze, and Odie's Photo Album. It also includes a music video, trailers, featurettes, a new Garfield comic strip by creator Jim Davis, along with a making of the strip featurette and an extended cut with eight minutes of footage not seen in theaters.
The theatrical cut of the film, which is 78 minutes long, is included on the DVD along with the extended version, which is 86 minutes long.
The film was released on a 3-disc Blu-ray/DVD/digital copy combo pack on October 11, 2011, alongside its predecessor.

Reception
On Rotten Tomatoes the film has a low rating of 12% from 78 surveyed critics, with an average rating of 3.5/10. The site's critical consensus reads, "Strictly for (very) little kids, A Tale of Two Kitties features skilled voice actors but a plot that holds little interest." On Metacritic, the film has a weighted average score of 37 out of 100 based on reviews from 20 critics, indicating "generally unfavorable reviews". Audiences polled by CinemaScore gave the film an average grade of "B+" on an A+ to F scale, the same grade earned by its predecessor.

Joe Leydon of Variety gave the film a positive review, saying "Good kitty! Superior in every way to its underwhelming predecessor, Garfield: A Tail of Two Kitties is a genuinely clever kidpic that should delight moppets, please parents – and maybe tickle a few tweens." Janice Page of The Boston Globe gave the film one and a half stars out of four, saying "You'll only be attracted to Garfield: A Tail of Two Kitties if you're very young, you're very easily entertained, or you just can't get enough of Jim Davis's lasagna-scarfing cartoon cat." Roger Ebert gave the film three out of four stars, saying "Garfield: A Tail of Two Kitties is actually funnier and more charming than the first film." Elizabeth Weitzman of New York Daily News gave the film one and a half stars out of four, saying "Connolly, bless him, throws himself heartily into the task of acting opposite a computer-generated cat given to bad puns and flatulence. Everyone else, however, looks mortified, and can you blame them?" Peter Hartlaub of the San Francisco Chronicle gave the film one out of four stars, saying "The best thing that can be said about Garfield: A Tail of Two Kitties is that the movie isn't quite as bad as its name." Nathan Rabin of The A.V. Club gave the film a C, saying "Two Kitties marks a considerable improvement over its predecessor. It's faster paced and the filmmakers wisely shift the focus away from bland owner Breckin Meyer and onto a menagerie of chattering animals. After a dreadful first entry, Two Kitties elevates the Garfield series almost to the level of mediocrity." Claudia Puig of USA Today gave the film one and a half stars out of four, saying "It comes off like a coughed-up furball: a wan rehash with too many elements of the hard-to-swallow 2004 original."

Accolades
The film was nominated for two Golden Raspberry Awards in 2006, one in the category "Worst Prequel or Sequel", and one in the category "Worst Excuse for Family Entertainment", but lost to Basic Instinct 2 and RV, respectively.

See also
 The Prince and the Pauper
 A Tale of Two Cities

References

External links

 
 
 
 
 Garfield: A Tail of Two Kitties Trailer at Apple.com (Requires Quick Time Player)

2006 films
2006 comedy films
2000s English-language films
American sequel films
American comedy films
Films about dogs
Films about cats
Films about pets
Films set in castles
Films set in London
Films shot in England
Films shot in London
Films about royalty
Films produced by John Davis
Films with live action and animation
Garfield films
Garfield (film series)
Live-action films based on comics
Live-action films based on animated series
Films based on The Prince and the Pauper
20th Century Fox films
Davis Entertainment films
Dune Entertainment films
Films scored by Christophe Beck
Films directed by Tim Hill
Films with screenplays by Joel Cohen
Films with screenplays by Alec Sokolow
2000s American films